Halysidota insularis is a moth of the family Erebidae. It was described by Walter Rothschild in 1909. It is found on Saint Lucia.

References

Halysidota
Moths described in 1909